Morgan v. Virginia, 328 U.S. 373 (1946), is a major United States Supreme Court case. In this landmark 1946 ruling, the U.S. Supreme Court ruled 7–1 that Virginia's state law enforcing segregation on interstate buses was unconstitutional. 

The case was argued by William H. Hastie, the former governor of the U.S. Virgin Islands and later a judge on the U.S. Court of Appeals for the Third Circuit. Thurgood Marshall of the NAACP was co-counsel; he later was appointed as a US Supreme Court justice. Hastie and Marshall used an innovative strategy to brief and argue the case. Instead of relying upon the Equal Protection clause of the 14th Amendment, they argued successfully that segregation on interstate travel violated the Interstate Commerce Clause of the U.S. Constitution. Virginia and other Southern states ignored the ruling, and continued with their practice of enforcing racial segregation in interstate transportation vehicles and facilities.

Background
"If something happens to you which is wrong, the best thing to do is have it corrected in the best way you can," said Irene Morgan, the African-American plaintiff who was arrested in Virginia for refusing to move from the  "White" to the "Colored" section on a Greyhound interstate bus. "The best thing for me to do was to go to the Supreme Court." 

In 1944, at the time of the incident, she was working at a defense contractor, the aircraft manufacturer Glenn L. Martin Company, based in Baltimore, Maryland. She worked on the production line making B-26 Marauders. She had traveled to Virginia to visit her mother. Morgan was arrested in Middlesex County on her return trip to Baltimore, after refusing to move at the direction of the bus driver.

Aftermath
In 1960, in Boynton v. Virginia, the Supreme Court extended the Morgan ruling to bus terminals used in interstate bus service. But the Southern states refused to comply and continued to eject or arrest African Americans who tried to use restrooms, waiting areas and cafeterias or lunch counters reserved for whites in such facilities, as Southern states refused to obey Morgan v. Virginia.

The efforts of the Freedom Riders in 1961 were undertaken in part to challenge the ineffectual adherence to this ruling in a number of the states in the Deep South.

References

External links
 

1946 in United States case law
United States Supreme Court cases
United States Supreme Court cases of the Vinson Court
Civil rights movement case law
United States racial desegregation case law
Thurgood Marshall